Tómasdóttir is an Icelandic patronymic surname, literally meaning "daughter of Thomas". Notable people with the name include:

Halla Tómasdóttir (born 1968), Icelandic businessperson
Karitas Tómasdóttir (born 1995), Icelandic footballer
Sigríður Tómasdóttir (1874–1957), Icelandic environmentalist
Sóley Tómasdóttir (born 1974), Icelandic politician

Icelandic-language surnames